Maja Ostaszewska (born 3 September 1972) is a Polish actress.

Biography 
She was born in Kraków, the daughter of Polish musician Jacek Ostaszewski, of the Ostoja Clan. Ostaszewska was raised Buddhist. She started her acting training in her native Kraków and later graduated from the PWST in 1996. She has since acted mostly at the Teatr Rozmaitości in Warsaw, working with well-known Polish directors such as Krystian Lupa, Krzysztof Warlikowski and Grzegorz Jarzyna.

In 1993, during her acting training, she played a small role in Steven Spielberg's Schindler's List, although her actual real film debut was in 1997 with the TV movie "Przystań." For this role, she received the Best Actress Award at the Polish Film Festival held in Gdynia in 1998.

Ostaszewska played one of the main characters in Academy Award-nominated Andrzej Wajda's Katyń.

In 2012 she received the Telekamera Award for Best Actress, and in February 2013 she received a Wiktor Award nomination for TV acting.

Personal life
She is in a relationship with Polish cinematographer Michał Englert, son of actor Maciej Englert. She has with him two children: son Franciszek (born 2007) and daughter Janina (born 2009). Maja is a vegetarian and Buddhist. She is also known for her support of the LGBT community.

Filmography
 Schindler's List (1993) – Frantic Woman
 Przystań (1998) – Karolina
 Prymas - trzy lata z tysiąca (2000) – Sister Leonia
 Egoiści (2000) – Client at an advertising agency
 Where Eskimos Live (2002) – Girl at the hotel
 The Pianist (2002) – Woman with Child
 Changes (2003) – Marta Mycinska
 Solidarność, Solidarność... (2005) – Adult Maja (episode 'Father')
 S@motność w sieci (2006) – Doctor
 Katyn (2007) – Anna
 Ile waży koń trojański? (2008) – Lidka
 Janosik: A True Story (2009) – Margeta
 Uwikłanie (2011) – Agata Szacka
 Przepis na życie (Recipe for life) (2011-2013, TV Series) – Beata Darmięta
 In the Name Of (2013) – Ewa
 Jack Strong (2014) – Hania
 Ziarno prawdy (2015) – Weronika Szacka (voice)
 Body (2015) – Anna
 Panie Dulskie (2015) – Melania Dulska
 Pitbull: Nowe porządki (2016) – Olka
 Pitbull. Niebezpieczne kobiety (2016) – Olka
 Diagnosis (2017-2018) – Anna Nowak
 Never Gonna Snow Again (2020)

External links
 
 Maja Ostaszewska at filmpolski.pl
 Maja Ostaszewska at culture.pl

References

1972 births
Ostaszewski family
Actresses from Kraków
Polish stage actresses
Living people
21st-century Polish actresses
Polish film actresses
Polish television actresses
Polish Buddhists
Clan of Ostoja
20th-century Polish actresses